Miguel Ángel Rincón Narvaez (born 31 March 1994) is a Colombian Paralympic swimmer who competes in international swimming competitions. He is a six-time Parapan American Games medalist winning four silvers and two bronzes and a World bronze medalist.

Firearm accident
When Rincón was nine, he was playing his PlayStation in his house and was looking through a drawer of his collection of the console's cassettes. He picked up a game and played the game on his PlayStation until he heard a pile of objects fall onto the floor, Rincón got distracted and looked at the mess on the floor, he got frightened when he saw a firearm in amongst the items. It was the first time that he had seen one and he didn't know where it came from and why it was there. He picked up the gun and it shot him in the chest and the bullet came out of his back.

He was found unconscious on the floor in his blood, he had also vomited blood and was taken to hospital where he had only one and a half litres of blood left in his body. He had reconstructive surgery on his stomach and digestive system, he had an operation on his pancreas, liver and a part of his lung, the bullet shrapnel was very close to his heart which developed a mild infection and surgeons successfully removed the shrapnel. Following his major surgeries, the doctors were surprised in how Rincón had survived the horrific gunshot that almost killed him however it left him with a spinal cord injury and he was unable to walk again.

References

1994 births
Living people
People from Bucaramanga
Paralympic swimmers of Colombia
Swimmers at the 2020 Summer Paralympics
Medalists at the 2019 Parapan American Games
S5-classified Paralympic swimmers